Procambarus bouvieri is a species of crayfish in the genus Procambarus, endemic to the Michoacán region of Mexico. It was formerly the only species in the subgenus Mexicambarus.

References

Cambaridae
Freshwater crustaceans of North America
Endemic crustaceans of Mexico
Crustaceans described in 1909
Taxa named by Arnold Edward Ortmann